Such Good Friends is an original musical comedy with book, music and lyrics by Noel Katz.

The musical was presented at the 2007 New York Musical Theatre Festival (NYMF), where it won five awards, including Talkin’ Broadway's Citation as the season's best musical.
It tells the story of three old friends working together in the early years of live television who are forced to name names before the House Un-American Activities Committee, and consequences of the different choices each character makes.

The NYMF presentation of Such Good Friends featured Tony nominees Liz Larsen and Brad Oscar.

References

External links
 Theatre Mania Review of NYMF 2007 and Such Good Friends
 Broadway World Review of Such Good Friends
 Edge New York Review of Such Good Friends
 Back Stage Review of Such Good Friends

2007 musicals